This is a list of Historic Sites on the Revolutionary War Heritage Trail in the American state of New York. The New York State Office of Parks, Recreation and Historic Preservation and the office of Heritage, New York, the New York City Department of Parks and Recreation, Brooklyn College and the City University of New York, and a local not-for-profit organization, Brooklyn Heritage, Inc.; placed a series of signs depicting 18 sites of historical significance in Brooklyn.

References

External links
Finding Aid to the Pierrepont Family Papers, 1805-1919 at the New York State Library, accessed May 11, 2016.

Heritage trails
1776
Kings
New York State Historic Markers in Kings County
Taverns in the American Revolution